Navin Fakirchand Shah  (born September 1946) is a British Labour Party politician.

Shah moved to the United Kingdom in 1973 to study at University College London. He joined the Labour Party in 1977 and was elected to Harrow London Borough Council as a councillor for Kenton East Ward in 1994. Shah was Leader of Harrow Council from 2004 to 2006, and remained the Harrow Labour Group Leader until June 2008.

He was elected as a member of the London Assembly at the 2008 assembly elections, taking the constituency seat of Brent and Harrow, beating Conservative incumbent Bob Blackman. He was re-elected in 2012 and 2016. He later challenged Blackman for his Harrow East parliamentary seat at the 2017 general election, and was defeated by just 1,757 votes.

With the deferral of 2020 London Assembly election he was elected chair of London Assembly on the 15 May 2020 succeeding Jennette Arnold.

Shah was appointed Commander of the Order of the British Empire (CBE) in the 2022 Birthday Honours for political and public service.

References

1946 births
Living people
Labour Members of the London Assembly
Councillors in the London Borough of Harrow
Architects from London
Alumni of University College London
British politicians of Indian descent
Indian emigrants to the United Kingdom
Commanders of the Order of the British Empire
People from Ahmedabad